J. A. McCaul was a Canadian businessman and politician. He operated a lumber and coal business in Regina, Saskatchewan and become mayor in 1890.  He was the first president of the Regina Chamber of Commerce.

References

Mayors of Regina, Saskatchewan
Businesspeople from Saskatchewan
19th-century Canadian politicians
Year of birth missing
Year of death missing